The Virginia's Eastern Shore AVA is an American Viticultural Area that includes a  length of Virginia's Eastern Shore and consists of the counties of Accomack and Northampton. The area is located on the southern end of the Delmarva Peninsula. The weather in the area is characterized by temperate summers and winters, significantly affected by the Chesapeake Bay and the Atlantic Ocean. The soil is sandy and deep.

As of 2014, Virginia Wine lists 2 commercial wineries in this AVA, Bloxom Vineyard and Chatham Vineyard on Church Creek.  Between them, they produce dry and sweet and red and white wines.

The hardiness zone is 8a.

References

External links
  

Geography of Accomack County, Virginia
American Viticultural Areas
Geography of Northampton County, Virginia
Virginia wine
1991 establishments in Virginia
Eastern Shore of Virginia